Warner Bros. Television Studios UK (formerly Shed Media Group and later Warner Bros. Television Productions UK) is a British creator and distributor of television content. The Group produces long-running television brands in drama, factual, documentary, factual entertainment, and history.

Established in 1998 as Shed Productions, the company floated on AIM (Alternative Investment Market) in March 2005. The group has grown significantly since flotation and to date, five award-winning media companies: Ricochet, Twenty Twenty, Wall to Wall, All3Media and Outright Distribution have all joined the group. In 2010, it was bought by Time Warner.

Company history 
Shed was established in 1998, specialising in producing long-running returnable drama including Waterloo Road, Bad Girls and Footballers' Wives. In March 2005, the company listed on AIM (Alternative Investment Market).

In November 2005, Shed acquired Ricochet, a leading production company specialising in factual entertainment. Ricochet created and produces global brand Supernanny. Other programmes include: Extreme Dreams, It's Me or the Dog, Breaking into Tesco and Blood, Sweat and T-shirts.

Shed acquired Outright Distribution (formerly Screentime Partners) in September 2006. The acquisition was a strategic move in order to maximise exploitation of the Group's IP through its own in-house distribution company, whilst growing third-party business.

In September 2007, Shed continued acquired BAFTA award-winning independent Twenty Twenty. Brands include: The Choir, That'll Teach 'Em, Brat Camp, Evacuation, and The Sorcerer's Apprentice.

Shed acquired Wall to Wall in November 2007. A multiple BAFTA winner, Wall to Wall produces long-running brands including BBC One's Who Do You Think You Are? and New Tricks. Reality dramas include: 1940's House and Frontier House. Docu-dramas include: The Day Britain Stopped and Filth: The Mary Whitehouse Story.

In 2008, Wall to Wall's Man on Wire won an Academy Award Oscar in the best Documentary Feature category.

On 5 August 2010, Warner Bros. Television secured a 55.75% stake in Shed Media. Warner Bros. completed its acquisition of a majority stake in Shed Media on 14 October. Under the deal, Shed Media will remain an independent company, but its global distribution arm, Outright Distribution, would be folded into the Warner's UK operation. The Shed management team held on to a 21.37% shareholding, with the remaining stake being split between a group of 27 key staff members.

Time Warner acquired 100% of Shed and renamed the group Warner Bros. Television Productions UK in June 2014. As of 2015 the name was completely phased out and all companies got completely integrated with new websites, however Shed Productions and Watershed became defunct with no new websites, little mentioning or integration.

Awards 
Shed Media was nominated for Float of the Year in 2005 and won Deal of the Year 2006 in the Quoted Company Awards for its acquisition of Ricochet. Several of Shed's programmes have won BAFTA, RTS, Rose D'Or and National Television Awards.

References

External links 
 

Warner Bros.
Companies based in the London Borough of Camden
British companies established in 1998
Mass media companies established in 1998
Television production companies of the United Kingdom
British subsidiaries of foreign companies
2010 mergers and acquisitions